The 2005 Air Force Falcons football team represented the United States Air Force Academy in the 2005 NCAA Division I-A football season. They were a member of the Mountain West Conference. The Falcons were coached by Fisher DeBerry and played their home games at Falcon Stadium. They finished the season 4–7, 3–5 in Mountain West play to finish in seventh place.

Schedule

Personnel

References

Air Force
Air Force Falcons football seasons
Air Force Falcons football